Owch Gonbad or Uchgonbad may refer to:
 Owch Gonbad-e Khan
 Owch Gonbad-e Soltan